The Kansas State Wildcats baseball team is a member of the NCAA and the Big 12 Conference. The program's first official game was in 1897.

Following the completion of the 2021 season, Kansas State's all-time record is 1,904–1,897–10.

Home field
Kansas State plays its home games at Frank Myers Field at Tointon Family Stadium. The stadium was built in 1961, and re-dedicated in 2002 with major improvements including a digital scoreboard, upgraded locker-room facilities, coaches' offices, and more.

The team's first official home field was an open public square in Manhattan located at Bluemont Avenue and 8th Street, which it began using in the 1898 season, called Athletic Field. Construction of Bluemont Elementary School on that plot of land forced Kansas State to move its athletics on campus beginning in 1911. The team's on-campus baseball diamond was initially located at the southwest corner of the campus, at the current location of Memorial Stadium. However, in the following decades the squad played at numerous locations around Manhattan, including City Park and (for many years) Griffith Park, before the opening of the current ballpark.

History
According to most sources, Kansas State began intercollegiate competition with a match against St. Mary's College on May 26, 1894. (St. Mary's was a regional athletics powerhouse, whose recent graduates included baseball pioneers Charles Comiskey and Ted Sullivan.) However, the first game reflected in the school's official history is a 4–3 win over Fort Riley on April 10, 1897. Playing in the old Kansas Intercollegiate Athletic Association, the baseball team earned its first varsity championship in 1907 under coach Mike Ahearn.

After joining the Missouri Valley Conference in 1913, the Kansas State baseball team won major conference titles in 1928, 1930 and 1933. The school's most recent championship was the Big 12 Conference regular season championship in 2013.  Kansas State's best finish at the Big 12 Conference baseball tournament was runner-up at the 2008 tournament.

Transcending results on the field, the team established an important milestone when Kansas State catcher Earl Woods, the father of golfer Tiger Woods, became the first African-American baseball player in the Big Seven Conference in 1951.

Recent seasons
The Wildcats have established a number of firsts for the program in recent years.  The team qualified for its first NCAA Tournament in 2009, and has returned three times since.  Kansas State also earned its first national rankings in the USA Today/ESPN Coach's Poll in 2009, and set a new school record for wins with 43 in 2009, breaking the previous mark of 35 set in 1976.

In 2013, the Wildcats won the Big 12 Conference title and reestablished a new team record for wins.  The school also was awarded the right to host the program's first NCAA regional. After winning the Manhattan Regional, Kansas State advanced to its first ever NCAA Super Regional.  The team played at the Corvallis Super Regional, falling to the host and Pac-12 champion Oregon State Beavers.  Kansas State finished ranked in the top 15 of all the major polls, the team's highest final rankings in history.

Individual honors
 Craig Wilson played for the U.S. baseball team at the 1992 Olympics.

Conference honors 

 Player of the Year
Craig Wilson – 1992
Nick Martini – 2010
Ross Kivett – 2013
 Pitcher of the Year
A. J. Morris – 2009

 Coach of the Year
Mike Clark – 1990
Brad Hill – 2009, 2013

 Newcomer of the Year
Jake Scudder – 2016

Rivalry
Kansas State's main rival is the Kansas Jayhawks.  The teams play every year in the Sunflower Showdown.

Former Wildcats in Major League Baseball
 As of the 2019 Major League Baseball draft, 1 Wildcat has been drafted under the tutelage of current coach Pete Hughes.
 12 former Wildcats have played at least one game in the Majors.

Conference membership history
 1905–1912: Kansas Intercollegiate Athletic Association
 1913–1927: Missouri Valley Conference
 1928–1995: Big Eight Conference (known as Big Six 1928–47 and Big Seven 1948–57)
 1996–present: Big 12 Conference

See also
 List of NCAA Division I baseball programs

References

External links